Rick Olczyk (born March 10, 1970) is an American ice hockey executive and assistant general manager of the Seattle Kraken. Previously he was the assistant general manager for the Edmonton Oilers of the National Hockey League (NHL) for six seasons. He is the younger brother of U.S. Hockey Hall of Famer Ed Olczyk.

Edmonton Oilers
Olczyk completed six seasons as assistant general manager with the Edmonton Oilers prior to joining the Hurricanes. He joined the Oilers’ hockey operations staff in 2007 as director of hockey administration and legal affairs, serving Edmonton's liaison to the NHL regarding all matters pertaining to the NHL Collective Bargaining Agreement. on September 11, 2009 he was promoted to serve as the Oilers' assistant general manager, a position he held until April 21, 2014, when he was replaced by Bill Scott.

The Carolina Hurricanes announced his appointment as assistant general manager on June 20, 2014.

College career
A 1992 graduate of Brown University Olczyk earned a J.D. degree from Cornell Law School in 1996. While at Brown, he played four seasons of Division I hockey and served as the Bears’ captain during his senior year. He played four seasons (1988 - 1992) of NCAA Division I hockey with the Brown Bears men's ice hockey team, where he was named to the 1991-92 Academic All-Ivy Team. Olczyk also captained the United States Under-17 National Team that won the Silver Medal at the 1986 World Cup.

References

External links

Rick Olczyk's profile at EliteProspects.com

1970 births
Living people
Brown Bears men's ice hockey players
Carolina Hurricanes executives
Edmonton Oilers executives
Sportspeople from Chicago
American men's ice hockey defensemen
Ice hockey people from Chicago